The 6th Rifle Division was an infantry division of the Soviet Union's Red Army. Formed twice, it participated in several battles, most notably the Soviet westward offensive of 1918–1919 and the Estonian War of Independence. The division's first formation was awarded the Order of the Red Banner twice and the Order of Suvorov 2nd class for its valor in combat. In November 1945, the division was disbanded. It was briefly reformed in 1955 but disbanded again in 1957.

First formation 
The division was first formed on 23 May 1918, in the city of Gdov. It was made up of volunteers from Petrograd, soldiers of Pavel Dybenko's volunteer detachment, Red Guards from the regular Army, and workers from the city of Narva in the city of Gdov. Its official designation upon activation was the Gatchina Infantry Division. From May to November 1918, the division was deployed in the vicinity of Ivangorod. On 31 May 1918, it became the 3rd Petrograd Infantry Division. On 11 September 1918, it became the 6th Rifle Division. Until November 1918, the division defended the approaches to Petrograd on the Narva and Revel directions. From November 1918 to January 1919, the division took part in the campaign of the Red Army in the Baltic States and Belarus. On 28 November 1918, the division occupied the city of Narva and further advanced to the Jägala river, which it reached in December 1918. Since January 1919, she retreated, fighting against the formations of the White movement and the Estonians, including in January 1919 at Koporye. In May 1919, the first assault by White Army units commanded by Nikolay Yudenich were defeated by the division. The division then became part of the Consolidated Baltic Division. On 5 August, the division retreated from the Yamburg area in order to concentrate on the defense of Petrograd. In autumn 1919, the rifle division defeated the Estonian 1st Division's Krasnaya Gorka Offensive. In October 1919, the division went on the offensive and captured Krasnoye Selo. In November 1919 the division attacked Narva with the Red Army, starting the Estonian War of Independence. This was part of the Soviet westward offensive, a campaign to conquer the Baltic states and Belarus. The unit was redesignated twice during this campaign.

The 6th Rifle Division then saw action in the campaign to conquer the city of Narva. This was a homecoming of sorts for the division, as many of its soldiers were workers from the city. The operation lasted from November through December 1919. The Estonian 1st Division and the White Russian Northwestern Division were pushed beyond the Soviet-Estonian border. The division protected the border from January to May 1920.

In May and June the division was called to participate in an offensive against Poland. By July and August the fighting was intensifying in the Dokshitsy region. By September the offensive was deep into Poland around the Warsaw region. The battle had now moved to areas around the city of Grodno. On 22 July 1920, the division took part in the crossing of the Niemen River during the First Battle of the Niemen River. The division pushed back the Polish-led 1st Lithuanian-Belarusian Infantry Division in the vicinity of Mosty. Although ultimately stopped by the Polish 81st Grodno Rifles Infantry Regiment, the division forced the Polish troops to retreat and abandon their lines.

Following the Polish summer retreat towards the Vistula, the division pursued the Polish forces. On 9 August it captured Wyszków and then advanced north of Bug, Narew and Vistula towards Łomża. The town fell to the Soviets, but a successful counter-attack on Łomża carried out by Polish 59th Greater Polish Infantry Regiment recaptured the town. The Soviet division lost many of their prisoners of war. Following the Battle of Warsaw, the 6th Rifle Division was defeated. Recreated as part of the Soviet defenses along the Niemen river, it took part in the Second Battle of the Niemen River. Defeated east of Wilejka by Polish cavalry, it was surrounded and eliminated. The Poles captured its headquarters, tabor, 13 field kitchens and the remaining two pieces of artillery, as well as all commanding officers of the division's regiments.

The unit was later re-created behind the front. On 6 December 1921, it received the honorific "Orel". The division was awarded the Order of the Red Banner for its actions. In 1939 the division became a training unit and split into separate cadres. The division was responsible for training the 122nd and the 180th Rifle Divisions.

Second formation 
The Second Formation of the 6th Rifle Division, probably formed from the 16th Rifle Regiment of the original division, took part in the Soviet invasion of Poland in September 1939. On 17 September it was a part of 11th Rifle Corps of 10th Army of the Belarus front. On 2 October, it was a part of 24th Rifle Corps of 4th Army of the Belarus Front.

After the end of the Soviet invasion of Poland in October 1939 the division became part of the Belorussian Special Military District's 6th Rifle Corps in the 4th Army. Almost the entire division (except for its howitzer regiment) was deployed within the Brest Fortress in the Western Special Military District. On the night of 14 June 1941, the division was put on combat alert. The division comprised the 84th, 125th, and 333rd Rifle Regiments, the 131st Artillery Regiment, and the 204th Howitzer Artillery Regiment. It began operations against the Germans with 13,700 personnel. However, Glantz writing in Colossus Reborn in 2005, says division strength on 22 June 1941, was 11,592.

The German attack, Operation Barbarossa, was launched on 22 June 1941. At that time many natives of the Voronezh area (from a draft in 1940 and spring 1941) served in the division's units. The division went into action as early as 04:00 against German attacks and suffered heavy losses. The division was split into several groups by German attacks and retreated to the east. By the end of 22 June, division headquarters was in the Hvedkovichi area. A second group, composed of the 125th Rifle Regiment and 111th Sapper Battalion was north of Zhabinka. A third group composed of the 84th Rifle Regiment and 204th Howitzer Artillery Regiment was fighting in the Radvanichi area. The remainder of the division could not retreat from Brest fortress and was destroyed during the defence of the fortress, which later became a symbol of Soviet resistance.

On 23 June, the division retreated to Kobryn. Attacks by the German 3rd Panzer Division cut the division into two groups during the day. The 204th Howitzer Regiment and other units led by the commander and chief of staff of the division retreated along the Pinsk road. Elements of the divisional staff, remnants of the artillery, rear units and remnants of the 84th and 333rd Rifle Regiments retreated northeast along the Warsaw highway under command of the division commissar. By the end of the day, the main forces of the division were on the east bank of the Yaselda River north and south of Bereza Kartuska. On June 24, German bombers raided the division on the Yaselda and resumed the attack under a heavy artillery barrage. For 6 hours, the division held the line against German tanks south of Bronnaya Gora.

On 25 June, the division continued to hold the line. After suffering heavy losses, the remnants of the division became part of a combined unit under command of General Popov. They retreated behind the Ptsich River and moved to Babruysk in the afternoon. The division defending the eastern bank of the Berezina River outside of the city. It demolished the bridge across the Berezina.

German troops of the XXIV Motorized Corps went on the offensive following mass aerial bombardments on 1 August. The attacks struck the defensive positions held by the 148th Rifle Division north of Krichev. The 4th Panzer Division advanced along the Krichev-Roslavl highway and units of the XLVI Panzer Corps advanced from Mstsislav. The 6th Rifle Division was deployed on the 13th Army's right flank and its 84th Rifle Regiment was cut off from the division's main forces. To restore the situation, a battalion from Leningrad was subordinated to the division and attempted to open a corridor to assist the 84th Regiment's breakout.

The Communist Battalion of Volunteers-from-Leningrad allocated to the division, supplied help to the surrounded regiment. Fighters under command of item of the lieutenant and Pryanishnikov's had rushed to resolute attack and on shoulders of fascists had rushed in Ганновку (to the north Милославичей), and destroyed up to a battalion of the opponent and captured a staff of a battalion. On the night of 4 August the division had broken from enemy rear and regained the main Soviet defence line.

In the fierce fights for settlements Zamoste, Гута-Сенска the division rendered sensitive losses to parts of the German 258th Infantry Division. The Germans left on the battlefield a hundred corpses, 30 motor vehicles, 45 motorcycles and large numbers of weapons. As of 1 September 1941, the division was a part of 45th Rifle Corps of the 13th Army of the Bryansk Front.
On the night of 2 September 1941, the 29th Motorized Division of 47th Motorized Corps forced Desna at the railway bridge to the south from White Berezki (Березки) and has grasped jumping-off place north of the west stations Znob. 13th Army headquarters took urgent measures to not allow expansion of the German jumping-off place. Fight was entered with 50th tank and both 307th and 6th shooting divisions.

As of 1 October 1941, was a part of 13th Army of the Bryansk Front. On 30 September and on 1 October, the division defended earlier taken positions. On 2 October, one of the division's regiments continued to defend a boundary from a mouth of the river Znobovka up to (the claim.) area Krenidovka, other parts in movement in area Suzemka with the task of mastering by it. The division took part in defensive fights near Bryansk, the Eagle and Kursk. The division was in the end of the first year of war among those formations which stopped the Germans on a boundary of the river Tima. At the city of Shchigry it strongly held positions during half a year.

In the end of June 1942, the division has appeared on a direction of the main impact of the German forces who have started the approach aside of Voronezh. For eight days of fighting, from 28 June until 6 July, the division destroyed 53 tanks, 64 motor vehicles, 4 planes, plus a lot of other enemy equipment, and many soldiers and officers. During this week parts of a division have strongly thinned also. However they have kept forces that right after deviation for Don, without rest and replenishment, to take defensive positions on the left-bank part of Voronezh and to repulse the pressed enemy.

And hardly the Germans have been stopped in a right-bank part of city as 6th division has successfully lead individual offensive operation and has begun jumping-off place Chizhovskomu.

After the battle in Voronezh, the division took part in the liberation of Ukraine, Romania, Hungary, and Czechoslovakia from German Nazi occupation. In August 1945, the division distinguished itself in Soviet invasion of Manchuria, fighting as part of the 53rd Army of the Transbaikal Front. The division has received for services in battle (September 1945) the honorific "Хинганская (Khiganskaya)" and was awarded another Order of the Red Banner and an Order of Suvorov. After the war it was briefly made part of the 5th Red Banner Army before being disbanded with the 57th Rifle Corps in autumn 1945. The division's history is commemorated at the museum of Boarding School No.4 on Leninsky Prospekt in Voronezh.

Third formation
The division was formed from the 90th Separate Rifle Brigade on 7 April 1948 with 4th Army at Lankaran. The 90th Separate Rifle Brigade had been formed in April 1943 as part of the Soviet troops in Iran. It was reorganised as the 60th Motor Rifle Division on 25 June 1957.

Commanders
 Dmitri Parsky: (25/05/1918 — 27/05/1918)
 Ivanov N. (27/05/1918 — 14/04/1919)
 Boris Freiman (14/04/1919 — 24/05/1919)
 Pyotr Solodukhin: (24/05/1919 — 22/08/1919)
 interim Nikolay Rozanov (22/08/1919 — 03/09/1919)
 interim Larichkin (03/09/1919 — 05/10/1919)
 interim Vladimir Lyubimov (05/10/1919 — 13/11/1919)
 interim A.Kuznetsov (13/11/1919 — 24/11/1919)
 Alexey Storozhenko (24/11/1919 — 24/11/1920)
 interim Ivan Shirokiy (24/11/1920 — 05/01/1921)
 Alexey Storozhenko (05/01/1921 — 07/1923)
 Ivan Smolin (07/1923 — 06/1924)
 Pyotr Bryanskikh (1924—1927)
 Leonid Petrovsky (11/1928 — 12/1930)
 Vladimir Kachalov (01/1931 — 05/1936)
 Ivan Shafransky (05/1936 — 05/1937)
 Nikolay Zolotukhin (08/09/1937 — 14/03/1941)
 Mikhail Popsuy-Shapko (14/03/1941 — 29/07/1941)
 Fyodor Ostashenko (30/07/1941 — 13/08/1941)
 Mikhail Grishin (14/08/1941 — 30/11/1942)
 Jacob Steiman (01/12/1942 — 09/02/1943)
 Leonid Goryashin (10/02/1943 — 30/06/1943)
 Kondraty Bilyutin (02/07/1943 — 16/08/1943)
 Efstafiy Grechany (17/08/1943 — 08/11/1943)

References

Citations

Bibliography

Sources
http://samsv.narod.ru/Div/Sd/sd006/default.html

006
Military units and formations established in 1918
Military units and formations disestablished in 1957
1918 establishments in Russia
Wikipedia articles needing cleanup after translation from Russian
Military units and formations awarded the Order of the Red Banner
Military units and formations of the Soviet invasion of Poland